Danny Glicker is an American costume designer. He was nominated for an Academy Award in the category Best Costume Design for the film Milk.

Selected filmography 

 Milk (2008)

References

External links 

Living people
Place of birth missing (living people)
Year of birth missing (living people)
American costume designers
American LGBT artists